PEAD could refer to:

Post-earnings-announcement drift
Presidential Emergency Action Documents

See also
Pead (disambiguation)